John Jack Bownass (July 27, 1930 – February 10, 2010) was a professional ice hockey player who played 80 games in the National Hockey League.  He played with the Montreal Canadiens and New York Rangers. He was born and died in Winnipeg, Manitoba.

The Canadian Amateur Hockey Association established a second Canada men's national ice hockey team in 1967, to increase the available pool of players at the 1968 Winter Olympics, and Father David Bauer recruited Bownass to coach the second team which was based in Ottawa.

Awards and achievements
MJHL Second All-Star Team  (1949)
MJHL First All-Star Team (1950)
IHL Second All-Star Team (1951)
QHL First All-Star Team (1958)
MJHL First All-Star Team Coach (1966)
Turnbull Cup MJHL Championship (1966)
"Honoured Member" of the Manitoba Hockey Hall of Fame

References

External links

Jack Bownass's  biography at Manitoba Hockey Hall of Fame
Jack Bownass' obituary

1930 births
2010 deaths
Baltimore Clippers players
Canadian ice hockey coaches
Canadian ice hockey defencemen
Ice hockey people from Winnipeg
Kingston Canadians coaches
Montreal Canadiens players
New York Rangers players
Shawinigan-Falls Cataracts (QSHL) players
Springfield Indians players
Winnipeg Black Hawks players
Winnipeg Rangers players